Beibeng or Baibung or Drepung is a township in Medog County, Nyingchi Prefecture in the Tibet region of China. It is located 29 kilometers southwest of the county headquarters, adjacent to the border with India, and is one of the frontiers of China's border defense. In 2007, there were 329 agricultural households with 2042 people, mainly Monba. Beibeng Township is located in a subtropical climate zone, which is completely different from the Qinghai-Tibet Plateau. There are many local tourist attractions, such as the Sarong Lake Scenic Reserve and the Khan Mi Cascade Waterfall.

The township has jurisdiction over 9 administrative villages: Beibeng Village (背崩村), A Cang Village (阿苍村), Badeng Village (巴登村),  Bodong Village (波东村), Xirang Village (西让村), Didong Village (地东村), Gelin Village (格林村), Dergong Village (德尔贡村), and Jiangxin Village (江新村).

Beibeng Township is a strategic point in China's frontier defense. In 1962, it was a battlefield of the Sino-Indian War during which People's Liberation Army captured territory south of the Brahmaputra and other areas controlled by India, but subsequently withdrew. India regained control of the land south of the McMahon Line in 1963. Today, the Sino-Indian Line of Actual Control is located in the west, one kilometer south of Barra Hill.

References

Further reading 

 
 
 Claude Arpi (4 December 2020). The New Road and Hydropower Plant in Metok. Indian Defence Review.
 Claude Arpi  (6 April 2021). Hydro, rail projects in Tibet a threat to India. Deccan Herald.

Populated places in Nyingchi